George Bartley may refer to:

 George Trout Bartley (1842–1910), English civil servant
 George Bartley (comedian) (1782–1858), English stage comedian
 George Bartley (editor), American ophthalmologist and journal editor